Laurentius Petrus Dignus "Lou" van den Dries (born May 26, 1951) is a Dutch mathematician working in model theory. He is a professor emeritus of mathematics at the University of Illinois at Urbana–Champaign.

Education
Van den Dries began his undergraduate studies in 1969 at Utrecht University, and in 1978 completed his PhD there under the supervision of Dirk van Dalen with a dissertation entitled Model Theory of Fields.

Career and research
Van den Dries was a member of the Institute for Advanced Study in the 1982–1983 academic year. He joined the faculty of the University of Illinois at Urbana–Champaign in 1986 and became a professor in its Center for Advanced Study in 1998. In 2021, van den Dries retired and became a professor emeritus.

Van den Dries is most known for his seminal work in o-minimality, but he has also made contributions to the model theory of -adic fields, valued fields, and finite fields, and to the study of transseries. With Alex Wilkie, he improved Gromov's theorem on groups of polynomial growth using nonstandard methods.
Van den Dries was an invited speaker at the International Congress of Mathematicians in 1990 and 2018, and delivered the Tarski Lectures at the University of California, Berkeley in 2017.

Awards and honours
Van den Dries has been a corresponding member of the Royal Netherlands Academy of Arts and Sciences since 1993. He was awarded the Shoenfield Prize from the Association for Symbolic Logic in 2016 for his chapter "Lectures on the Model Theory of Valued Fields" in Model Theory in Algebra, Analysis and Arithmetic, edited by Dugald Macpherson and Carlo Toffalori. Van den Dries was jointly awarded the 2018 Karp Prize with Matthias Aschenbrenner and Joris van der Hoeven "for their work in model theory, especially on asymptotic differential algebra and the model theory of transseries".

Ethics training
Since 2004, employees of the state of Illinois, including University of Illinois faculty, are required by the State Officials and Employees Ethics Act to complete ethics training annually. From 2006 to 2009, van den Dries refused to complete this training, arguing that
mandatory ethics training for adults is an Orwellian concept and has no place in a civil and free society. It is Big Brother reducing us to the status of children. Symptoms: monitoring of the test taking, the 'award' of a diploma for passing the test. It betrays a totalitarian urge on those in power to infantilize the rest of us.

An unfortunate byproduct of the computer revolution is that it has given new tools in the hands of unwise rulers to annoy us for no good reason. Rather than go meekly along, we should vigorously protest and resist whenever demeaning schemes like ethics training rear their ugly head.
Eventually, van den Dries settled with the Illinois Executive Ethics Commission, which enforces the ethics act, for a $500 fine, noting that "while many of my colleagues agree that this ethics training is a big waste of time and money, they didn't really take the steps I took in trying to fight it. So without active support from my colleagues, it became too time consuming and costly (lawyers fees) to continue my resistance." Van den Dries was the first state employee to be fined by the Illinois Executive Ethics Commission for failing to complete the mandatory training.

Selected publications

References

Living people
University of Illinois Urbana-Champaign faculty
Utrecht University alumni
Dutch mathematicians
Dutch logicians
Mathematical logicians
Model theorists
Members of the Royal Netherlands Academy of Arts and Sciences
Tarski lecturers
1951 births